Brittni Joi Mason (born April 19, 1998) is an American Paralympic athlete who competes in sprinting events at international elite competitions. She is a World champion and has been selected to compete at the 2020 Summer Paralympics.

References

External links
 
 
 

1998 births
Living people
American female sprinters
Paralympic track and field athletes of the United States
Paralympic gold medalists for the United States
Paralympic silver medalists for the United States
Paralympic medalists in athletics (track and field)
Athletes (track and field) at the 2020 Summer Paralympics
Medalists at the 2020 Summer Paralympics
Medalists at the World Para Athletics Championships
Eastern Michigan Eagles women's track and field athletes
Track and field athletes from Cleveland